Yellow is a color.

Yellow may also refer to:

Biology
 Clouded yellow, a common name for a butterfly in genus Colias
 Grass yellow, a common name for a butterfly in genus Eurema
 Yellow, a common name for a butterfly in subfamily Coliadinae
 Yellow baboon, Papio cynocephalus, a species of baboon

Books and comics
 Yellow (short story collection), a short-story collection by Don Lee
 Yellow (manga), a 2002 yaoi manga by Makoto Tateno
 Yellow: Race in America Beyond Black and White, a book by Frank H. Wu
 Yellow (Pokémon Adventures), a character in Pokémon Adventures

Film and television
 Yellow (1997 film), a film written and directed by Chris Chan Lee
 Yellow (2006 feature film), a film starring Roselyn Sanchez
 Yellow (2006 short film), a film by director Neill Blomkamp
 "Yellow", an episode of Tales from the Crypt
 Yellow (1996 short film), a film written and directed by Simon Beaufoy
 Yellow (2012 film), starring Sienna Miller, Ben Foster, Riley Keough and Lucy Punch
 Yellow (2014 film), an Indian Marathi film directed by Mahesh Limaye
 "Yellow", an episode from the TV series Teletubbies

Games
 Pokémon Yellow version, the fourth (and final) installment in the first generation of Pokémon games
Yellow Squadron, a rival ace squadron in Ace Combat 4

Music

Performers
 Yello, a Swiss electronic duo
 Yellow, a member of the South Korean group Pungdeng-E

Albums
 Yellow (Brymo album), 2020
 Yellow (Scandal album), 2016
 Yellow (Shane Eagle album), 2017
 The Yellow, an EP by Lemon Jelly, 1999
 Zebrahead (album) or Yellow, by Zebrahead, 1998
 Yellow, by Calema, 2020
 Yellow  (EP), by South Korean singer/songwriter Kang Daniel, 2021
Yellow, by Emma-Jean Thackray, 2021

Songs
 "Yellow" (Coldplay song), 2000
 "Yellow" (Kaela Kimura song), 2007
 "Yellow", by Aminé from Good for You, 2017
 "Yellow", by Tyler, the Creator from Cherry Bomb, 2015
 "Yellow", by For the Fallen Dreams from Back Burner, 2011
 "Yellow", by Nicholas Tse, 2005
 "Yellow", by Rich Brian from The Sailor, 2019
 "Yellow", by Robin Schulz from Sugar, 2015
 "Yellow", by Sheila E. from Romance 1600, 1985
 "Yellow", by Yann Tiersen from the Tabarly soundtrack, 1998

Other uses
 High yellow, skin pigmentation
 Yellow (clothing), a Bangladesh-based fashion brand and retailer
 Yellow Transportation, a United States freight company
 Yubo, formerly Yellow, a social media app
 Yellow (convenience store), an Israeli chain operated by Paz Oil Company Ltd.
 Yellow, a play by Del Shores
 FD&C Yellow 5, the food coloring tartrazine
 YellOw (gamer), South Korean former professional StarCraft player

See also
 Yellow Creek (disambiguation)
 Yellow River (disambiguation)
 Yellow Submarine (disambiguation)
 Yellows (disambiguation)